Wari is a tehsil located in Central Dir District, Khyber Pakhtunkhwa, Pakistan.

See also 

 Upper Dir District
 Wari, Upper Dir

References

External links
Khyber-Pakhtunkhwa Government website section on Lower Dir
United Nations
Hajjinfo.org Uploads
 PBS paiman.jsi.com

Central Dir District
Tehsils of Upper Dir
Tehsils of Khyber Pakhtunkhwa